Terrifier is a 2016 independent slasher film written and directed by Damien Leone. It stars Jenna Kanell, Samantha Scaffidi, Catherine Corcoran, and David Howard Thornton. The film follows partygoer Tara Heyes, who becomes the target of a serial killer known as Art the Clown on Halloween night. The film additionally follows a disfigured survivor’s of Art's attack descent into madness. 

It is the second feature-length film to feature Art, following the horror anthology film All Hallows' Eve (2013)—although it has no connection to this film. Leone wrote the film specifically as means of showcasing Art and Leone's practical effects—such as the controversial hacksaw death scene. Leone has expressed regret for leaving the protagonists underdeveloped. Leone filmed Terrifier on a low-budget of $35k. It had an Indiegogo campaign, although it ultimately did not reach its goal. 

Mike Gianelli, who portrayed all prior incarnations of Art, retired from acting before production began, and Thornton replaced him as Art. It premiered at the Telluride Horror Show Film Festival in October 2016 before being picked up by Dread Central Presents and Epic Pictures for a limited theatrical release in March 2018. The film received mixed reviews, with praise directed towards the special effects and the portrayals of Scaffidi and Thornton, while the writing was subject to criticism. The movie quickly became a cult film. A sequel,  Terrifier 2, was released on October 6, 2022.

Plot
A man is watching a small TV where Monica Brown, a talk show host, interviews a severely disfigured woman, the sole survivor of a massacre that took place the previous Halloween. Brown mentions that the body of the killer, known only as "Art the Clown", disappeared from the morgue, suggesting he is still alive. However, the disfigured woman insists she saw him die. The man, revealed to be Art the Clown, furiously kicks the TV and fills a garbage bag with bladed objects. After the interview, Monica talks to her partner on the phone and makes disparaging remarks about the interviewee because of her appearance. The disfigured woman, who'd been eavesdropping, attacks Monica and gouges out her eyes, laughing maniacally.

On Halloween night, two friends, Tara and Dawn, leave a Halloween party, and encounter Art the Clown. He follows them into a pizzeria and makes advances at Tara, unnerving her. The restaurant owner later roughly escorts Art from the premises for smearing his feces over the bathroom walls. The girls then leave the pizzeria to discover that one of Dawn's car tires has been slashed, and Tara calls her sister Vicky to come pick them up. Meanwhile, Art returns to the pizzeria, where he kills and mutilates the two workers. While waiting, Tara asks a pest control worker, Mike, if she can enter the derelict apartment building he's working in to use the restroom. While inside, she encounters the Cat Lady, a deluded squatter who believes the doll she carries is her infant child. Art enters Dawn's car and abducts her. 

Tara then encounters Art inside the apartment building, where he gives chase and attacks her with a scalpel. He eventually subdues her, rendering her unconscious with a sedative. Tara awakens bound to a chair, and Art reveals Dawn, suspended upside-down. He forces Tara to watch as he saws Dawn in half with a hacksaw. Tara escapes and batters Art with a 2x4 until he produces a gun and shoots her to death. The Cat Lady witnesses this and begs Mike to call the police, but he dismisses her as insane. Art stalks Mike and knocks him unconscious with a hammer. The Cat Lady then discovers Art cradling her doll, and in a plea for the return of her "child," she tries to show motherly compassion to Art by cradling him.

Vicky arrives to take Tara and Dawn home but is lured into the basement by Art. There, she discovers Art, who has severely mutilated the Cat Lady and is wearing her scalp and breasts. He chases Vicky and corners her into a locker, but turns his attention to Mike's co-worker arriving at the building. After ambushing and decapitating him, Art continues to chase Vicky. She manages to escape him but stops to grieve upon finding her sister's corpse. Art then catches up to her and attacks her with a makeshift cat o' nine tails, but Mike, having recovered, arrives and knocks Art unconscious. The two flee and call 9-1-1 but Art appears and overpowers Mike, stomping on his head repeatedly and killing him. Vicky retreats into a garage, but Art rams through the door and runs her over with a pickup truck, incapacitating her. As she lies unconscious, Art begins to eat her face. The police finally arrive, but Art shoots himself inside his mouth with a pistol before he can be apprehended. The officers discover Vicky is still alive.

Art's body is taken to a morgue, along with the bodies of his deceased victims. When the medical examiner unzips Art's body bag, Art reanimates and strangles him to death. One year later, Vicky is released from the hospital after rehabilitation from the injuries inflicted by Art; she is revealed to be the severely disfigured woman from the film's opening scene and thus the events of the entire movie took place that previous year.

Cast

 Jenna Kanell as Tara Heyes, Vicky's older sister.
 Samantha Scaffidi as Victoria "Vicky" Heyes, Tara's younger sister.
 Catherine Corcoran as Dawn, Tara's best friend.
 David Howard Thornton as Art the Clown
 Pooya Mohseni as the Cat Lady
 Matt McAllister as Mike the Exterminator
 Katie Maguire as Monica Brown
 Gino Cafarelli as Steve
 Erick Zamora as Ramone
 Cory Duval as Coroner
 Michael Leavy as Will the Exterminator #2
Kearrah Wilson as the doll

Production 
The character of Art the Clown first appeared as a supporting character in the 2008 short film The 9th Circle, which Leone wrote and directed. Leone later wrote and directed a short film titled Terrifier, which featured Art as the main antagonist and was released in 2011. These shorts were incorporated into the 2013 anthology film All Hallows' Eve, which marked both Art's first feature film appearance and Leone's feature directorial debut.

In 2015, Leone launched a campaign on the crowdfunding website Indiegogo to finance Terrifier, a feature-length spin-off of All Hallows' Eve. After being notified of the Indiegogo campaign, filmmaker Phil Falcone provided the necessary funds for the project in exchange for a producer credit. In The 9th Circle, the short film Terrifier, and All Hallows' Eve, Art was played by Mike Giannelli, who opted not to return to the role for the feature film Terrifier due to not wanting to pursue anymore major acting roles. Instead, the role of Art was recast to David Howard Thornton. Thornton was already familiar with All Hallows' Eve when he auditioned for the role of Art in Terrifier, and was cast in the role after improvising a kill scene in mime.

Release 
Terrifier premiered at the Telluride Horror Show Film Festival in 2016. It was later screened at the Horror Channel FrightFest on October 28, 2017, and was subsequently picked up by Dread Central Presents and Epic Pictures for a limited 2018 release.

Home media
Terrifier was released on DVD and Blu-ray by Dread Central on March 27, 2018. The release features audio commentary from Damien Leone and David H. Thornton, behind-the-scenes footage, an interview with star Jenna Kanell, deleted scenes, collectible reversible cover art, and several other bonus features.

Critical response
On review aggregator Rotten Tomatoes, Terrifier holds an approval rating of 53% based on 19 reviews, and an average rating of 5.8/10. While Scaffidi and Thornton's portrayals and the special effects were well received by critics, criticism of the film was directed mostly at the dialogue, the acting in certain scenes, and the lack of character development of the protagonists.

John Higgins (Starburst) praised the performances of Kanell and Corcoran in that they "are attractive leads and hold the attention." Higgins also praised the film's balance of suspense and gore.
Anton Bitel of the British Film Institute described the film as a "subtext-free thrill-and-kill ride which openly advertises the sheer senselessness and gratuity of all its on-screen cat-and-mouse deaths by numbers" and "an unapologetically ‘pure’ genre entry, confronting – and amusing – us with all the sinister masked vicariousness of the Halloween spirit." Cody Hamman of Arrow in the Head awarded the film a score of 8 out of 10, calling it "a very simple film, providing 84 minutes of stalking and slashing that occurs largely within the confines of one location. Leone directs the hell out of that simple scenario, though, milking every possible bit of tension from each moment. It's a thrilling, brutal, gory '80s throwback that I recommend checking out, especially if you have a fondness for the same decade of films that this movie obviously holds in high regard." Sol Harris of the magazine Starburst gave the film a score of 6 out of 10, writing: "Presented as something of a throwback to horror B-movies of the '80s, Terrifier has far more style - both visually and audibly - than the average film of this nature. It's a surprisingly nice looking film for a movie about a clown chopping people into pieces." Jeremy Aspinall of Radio Times praised the film, writing "But despite the unsparing gore, there's also plenty of atmosphere and a gnawing tension that's maintained all the way to the sequel-hinting climax." In a thesis by M. Keith Booker, he writes that rather than evolving the slasher film genre in different directions, Terrifier acts as a homage to the 1980s films of the subgenre but with better special effects and higher production values. Booker also observes similarities with Dawn's (Corcoran) hacksaw death scene and Freddy Krueger's pursuit of Nancy Thompson in the bathtub scene in A Nightmare on Elm Street (1984).

The film was not without its detractors. Amyana Bartley of FilmInquiry.com felt that the film's script lacked both clear protagonists and depth, writing, "Art the Clown has the potential to be a formidable, gruesome, franchise horror character, he just needs more seasoning and cultivation." Felix Vasquez Jr. of Cinema Crazed called it "fairly mediocre slasher fare", stating that the film lacked any creativity and tension while also criticizing its story line. Vasquez concluded his review by stating "As a film Terrifier aims high, but feels like a very disposable party favor you'll have forgotten once the credits roll."

Accolades
The film received three Fangoria Chainsaw Award nominations: Best Limited Release, Best Supporting Actor (Thornton), and Best Makeup FX (Leone).

Sequel

In February 2019, Damien Leone stated that a sequel for Terrifier was in production, with the other sequel's script having already been written. The film went into production in October 2019 with Fuzz on the Lens Productions as co-producers along with Dark Age Cinema. The film was initially delayed during production of its final days of shooting due to the COVID-19 pandemic, but finally resumed in September 2020 and wrapped shooting in 2021.
The film debuted at the Arrow Video FrightFest in London, England on August 29, 2022, before receiving a nationwide US cinema release on October 6, 2022, and was released to streaming platforms on November 11, 2022.

References

External links
 
 
 
 

2016 films
2016 horror films
American slasher films
American splatter films
Fictional clowns
American supernatural horror films
2010s monster movies
2010s slasher films
Horror films about clowns
Halloween horror films
Film spin-offs
2010s English-language films
Films directed by Damien Leone
2010s American films